Anna Kalinskaya and Tereza Mihalíková were the defending champions, but both players were ineligible to participate. 

Bianca Andreescu and Carson Branstine won the title, defeating Maja Chwalińska and Iga Świątek in the final, 6–1, 7–6(7–4).

Seeds

Draw

Finals

Top half

Bottom half

References 

Draw 

Girls' Doubles
Australian Open, 2017 Girls' Doubles